"The New Girl in School" is a song written by Jan Berry, Roger Christian, Brian Wilson, and Bob Norberg for the American rock duet Jan and Dean. It was the B-side of their hit single "Dead Man's Curve". Both songs were released on their album Dead Man's Curve / The New Girl In School. "The New Girl From School" charted at number 37 on the Billboard Hot 100.

Background
The song was initially titled "Gonna Hustle You", but Liberty Records made Jan and Dean change the title and lyrics because the label thought the general public would interpret the song as being too raunchy, insinuated by the word "hustle". Jan and Dean then renamed the song to "Get A Chance With You" and changed some of the lyrics, however, the record company still thought the meaning of the song was too suggestive.  Jan & Dean retitled the song to "The New Girl in School" and brought in a fourth songwriter, Roger Christian to help rewrite the lyrics.

Personnel
Jan Berry – lead and backing vocals
Dean Torrence – lead and backing vocals
Jill Gibson – backing vocals
The Wrecking Crew – instrumentation

Release history
The song was Jan & Dean's best charting B-side. After Jan Berry's near fatal crash near Dead Man's Curve in April 1966, Liberty put out the version "Gonna Hustle You" on Jan and Dean's album Filet of Soul: A "Live" One. In 1973, Dean Torrance released "Gonna Hustle You" as a single, by overdubbing the original lyrics under his band, Legendary Masked Surfers. In 1976, Jan and Dean released "Gonna Hustle You" as a single. In 1996, the version "Get A Chance With You" got an official release on the album, All The Hits From Surf City To Drag City.

Cover versions
 1975 - The Magnificent Mercury Brothers, Transatlantic Records BIG 532 7"
 1990 – Peter Stampfel & The Bottle Caps, Smiles, Vibes & Harmony: A Tribute to Brian Wilson (as "Gonna Hustle You")
 1995 – Alex Chilton, A Man Called Destruction

References

Jan and Dean songs
Songs written by Roger Christian (songwriter)
Songs written by Bob Norberg
1964 singles
Songs written by Jan Berry
Songs written by Brian Wilson
1964 songs
Liberty Records singles
Songs about school